David Nalbandian was the defending champion but did not compete that year.

Nikolay Davydenko won in the final 6–4, 6–3 against Agustín Calleri.

Seeds

  Jiří Novák (first round)
  Rainer Schüttler (first round)
  Sjeng Schalken (first round)
  Fernando González (quarterfinals)
  Tommy Robredo (semifinals)
  Yevgeny Kafelnikov (quarterfinals)
  Max Mirnyi (semifinals)
  Jarkko Nieminen (second round)

Draw

Finals

Top half

Bottom half

External links
 2003 Estoril Open draw

2003 Men's Singles
Singles
Estoril Open